Poslednja Igra Leptira (trans. Last Dance of a Butterfly) was a Yugoslav and Serbian pop rock band from Belgrade.

Biography
The band was formed by Nenad "Neša" Radulović in 1979. In the beginning, they performed as an acoustic country band. After they won at the Palilulska Olimpijada Kulture contest in 1981, their popularity started to grow, and the permanent line-up was formed: Nenad Radulović (vocals), Draško Janković (guitar), Zorica Đermanov (vocals), Olivera Perić (violin), Sašo Bogojevski (bass guitar), Dragan Todorović (drums), Dušan Hristić (keyboards) and Dragomir Bulić (saxophone). Their debut album Napokon ploča (At Last, a Record) was released by ZKP RTLJ on October 11, 1982. They achieved huge success with different musical genres represented on the album and humorous short stories and imitations between the songs. Songs "Nataša" ("Natasha") and "Vrati se" ("Come Back") were the album's biggest hits. Until the end of the year they held fifteen sold out concerts in Belgrade's Dom Sindikata. In the first half of 1983, Dragomir Bulić and Dušan Hristić left the band and keyboardist Slobodan Mitić became the band's new member.

On September 19, 1983, ZKP RTLJ released the band's second studio album Ponovo ploča & druge priče (Another Record & Other Stories). Music and lyrics were written by Neša Radulović, except for "Otići ću" ("I'll Leave"), for which music was written by Miodrag Božidarević. Main hits from this album were "Sličuge" ("Skates") and "Hvala ti za muziku" ("Thank You for the Music"). Near the end of 1984, Olivera Perić and Zorica Đermanov left the band, and after male members came back from the army, the band started working with singer Lidija Asanović from Zagreb. PGP-RTB released their third album Opet ploča - Srce od meda (Again, a Record - Heart Made of Honey) on September 17, 1985. Music and lyrics were witen by Neša Radulović, except for "Dečko, 'ajde o'ladi" ("Chill Out, Boy") for which music was written by Radulović and Sašo Bogojevski. Special guest on this album was Riblja Čorba frontman Bora Đorđević. The biggest hit from the album was "Dečko, 'ajde o'ladi", Radulović's duet with Lidija Asanović, which brought them Oskar popularnosti award for the Pop Band of the Year.

Fourth album Grudi moje Balkanske (My Balkan Heart) was released on October 8, 1986 by PGP-RTB. The authors of all the songs were Neša Radulović and Dragomir "Miki" Stanojević. The songs "Umiru jeleni" ("Deer Are Dying") and "Taxi" became hits, and the title track was released as a single on November 25 and topped the charts. The fifth album Zajedno smo piškili u pesku (We Peed in the Sand Together) was released on December 8, 1987 by PGP-RTB and produced by Kornelije Kovač. The lyrics for the title song were written by Bora Đorđević. Special guest on the album were Jelica Sretenović and Aleksandra Kovač on backing vocals. Minor hits from this album were "Ruska čokolada" ("Russian Chocolate"), "Zajedno smo piškili u pesku" and "Tibet".

In 1989, the band went on hiatus and Radulović released his solo album Niko nema što piton imade (Nobody Has what Python Had), which parodied "novokomponovana muzika". He did not manage to finish his second album, recording only the song "Modra bajka'" ("Blue Fairytale"), because he died of testicular cancer on February 12, 1990. ITMM released Modra bajka - Best of in 1997, which featured old Poslednja Igra Leptira hits, the song "Modra bajka" and some of the band's live recordings.

Legacy

In April 1997, a tribute concert was organized in Belgrade's Sava Centar, on which popular musicians performed Poslednja Igra Leptira songs. The song "Umiru jeleni" was covered by Croatian punk rock band Grupa Tvog Života from Osijek on their 2007 album Kolo je spojilo ljude (Kolo Brought People Together).

The album Napokon ploča was polled in 1998 as 97th on the list of 100 greatest Yugoslav popular music albums in the book YU 100: najbolji albumi jugoslovenske rok i pop muzike (YU 100: The Best albums of Yugoslav pop and rock music).

In 2011, the song "Nataša" was polled, by the listeners of Radio 202, one of 60 greatest songs released by PGP-RTB/PGP-RTS during the sixty years of the label's existence.

In December 2011, a plateau in Belgrade was named after Radulović. In October 2012, a commemorative plaque in memory of Radulović was revealed in Lajkovac.

Discography

Studio albums
Napokon ploča (1982)
Ponovo  ploča & druge priče (1983)
Opet ploča - Srce od meda (1985)
Grudi moje balkanske (1986)
Zajedno smo piškili u pesku (1987)

Compilations
Modra bajka - Best of (1997)

References

External links 
 Official YouTube channel
 

Serbian rock music groups
Serbian pop rock music groups
Yugoslav rock music groups
Musical groups from Belgrade
Musical groups established in 1979
Musical groups disestablished in 1989